Mohamed Abdallah Golo (born 14 May 1976) is a retired Tanzanian football striker.

References

1976 births
Living people
Tanzanian footballers
Tanzania international footballers
Zanzibar international footballers
Mlandege F.C. players
Young Africans S.C. players
Miembeni S.C. players
Association football forwards
Tanzanian Premier League players